Cratocentrus is a genus of wasps in the family Chalcididae. Species are found in Asia and Africa.

Species 
 Cratocentrus argenteopilosus, synonym of Cratocentrus ruficornis
 Cratocentrus auropilosus, synonym of Cratocentrus ruficornis
 Cratocentrus bicornutus, synonym of Cratocentrus ruficornis
 Cratocentrus birmanus (Masi, 1944)
 Cratocentrus decoratus (Klug, 1834)
 Cratocentrus fastuosus (Masi, 1944)
 Cratocentrus maculicollis (Masi, 1944)
 Cratocentrus pruinosus (Steffan, 1959)
 Cratocentrus ruficornis (Cameron, 1907)
 Cratocentrus tomentosus (Nikolskaya, 1952)

References

External links 

 
 Cratocentrus at insectoid.info

Hymenoptera genera
Chalcidoidea